Bullard Independent School District is a public school district based in Bullard, Texas (USA).

The district is located in southwestern Smith County and extends into a small portion of northwestern Cherokee County.

In 2009, the school district was rated "academically acceptable" by the Texas Education Agency.

Schools
Bullard High School (Grades 9-12)
Bullard Middle School (Grades 7-8)
Bullard Intermediate School (Grades 5-6)
Bullard Elementary School (Grades 3-4)
Bullard Primary School (Grades 1-2)
Bullard Early Childhood School (Grades PK-K)

References

External links
Bullard ISD

School districts in Smith County, Texas
School districts in Cherokee County, Texas